Malexander is a small village in Boxholm Municipality, Sweden, about  southwest of Linköping and  southeast of Boxholm. It is located close to the lake Sommen and has a jetty where the steamboat S/S Boxholm II stops. It is well known for the 1999 Police Murders.

History
There is evidence of a church in Malexander from at least the 13th century. The current church, Malexander Church, was built in 1881 and partly rebuilt following a fire in 1929.

Malexander murders

On 28 May 1999, one of the most high-profile murders in Sweden took place in Malexander when two police officers were executed following a bank robbery in Kisa.

Notable people
 Hilding Hagberg, chairman of the Swedish Communist Party (1951–1963) 
 Sven Stolpe, author
 Bengt Åkerblom, author of Åkerblomstolen
 Pelle Björnlert, riksspelman.

References

External links
Official website

Boxholm Municipality
Populated lakeshore places in Sweden
Populated places in Östergötland County
Populated places in Boxholm Municipality
Sommen